Maria Strømme, (born 7 April 1970 in Svolvær) is a Norwegian physicist who lives and works in Sweden.

Career 
She became a professor in nanotechnology at Uppsala University in 2004. She is Sweden's youngest professor in a technical subject. Strømme holds a master of science degree in engineering physics, and completed her thesis in physics in 1997 at Uppsala University. She became a scientist at Naturvetenskapliga forskningsrådet. Between 2002 and 2007, she worked as an academy physicist and she was elected to the Royal Swedish Academy of Sciences. She is also a member of the Norwegian Academy of Technological Sciences and the Norwegian Academy of Science and Letters.

References

1970 births
Living people
People from Vågan
Norwegian emigrants to Sweden
Swedish physicists
Academic staff of Uppsala University
Members of the Royal Swedish Academy of Sciences
Members of the Norwegian Academy of Technological Sciences
Members of the Norwegian Academy of Science and Letters
Members of the Royal Society of Sciences in Uppsala